Chenxiang Huaqi Wan is a greyish-brown to yellowish-brown pill used in Traditional Chinese medicine to "regulate the flow of qi in the liver and the stomach, and to remove the retention of undigested food". It is used in cases where there is "stagnation of qi in the liver and the stomach marked by distending pain in the epigastrium, feeling of stuffiness and fullness in the chest, anorexia, belching and acid regurgitation".  
It is aromatic in odour and tastes slightly sweet and bitter.

Chinese classic herbal formula

See also
 Chinese classic herbal formula
 Bu Zhong Yi Qi Wan

References

Traditional Chinese medicine pills